Kasso is a surname and given name. Notable people with this name include:

 Kasso Okoudjou, Beninese academic
 Lev Kasso (1865–1914), Russian politician
 Mihal Kasso, Greek politician
 Ricky Kasso, American murderer

See also